Ghaziabad District is in the northern part of Kunar Province, Afghanistan. It was created in 2004 from the northern part of Bar Kunar District. It was named after the Khan of Ghaziabad,  Amir Muhammad Ghazi Khan Shaheed. Its population is 7,500 (2004).

The district center is the village of Ghaziabad at  altitude. T he area is mountainous and there is little arable land. Many of its residents work in Pakistan.

Boundaries
Ghaziabad District borders on:
 Nuristan Province to the northwest and north
 Naray District to the east
 Bar Kunar District to the south
 Dangam District to the west

References

External links

Districts of Kunar Province

ru:Гхазиабад